The 1991 Monaco Grand Prix was a Formula One motor race held at Monaco on 12 May 1991. It was the fourth race of the 1991 Formula One World Championship.

The 78-lap race was won from pole position by Brazilian driver Ayrton Senna, driving a McLaren-Honda. It was Senna's fourth victory from the first four races of the season, and his fourth Monaco win. Englishman Nigel Mansell finished second in a Williams-Renault, with Frenchman Jean Alesi third in a Ferrari.

Qualifying

Pre-qualifying report
The pre-qualifying session on Thursday morning ended up being somewhat straightforward for Dallara and Jordan. JJ Lehto was fastest for Dallara, with Emanuele Pirro in third, with Jordan's Andrea de Cesaris and Bertrand Gachot second and fourth.

Gachot was over a second faster than the fifth-placed car, the Modena Lambo of Nicola Larini. The other Lambo of Eric van de Poele was sixth, with Pedro Chaves seventh in the Coloni on his first experience of the Monaco circuit. Olivier Grouillard propped up the time sheets for Fondmetal as he continued to gain experience in the new Fomet car.

Pre-qualifying classification

Qualifying report
Ayrton Senna shocked no-one by taking pole position, but second place was a surprise with Stefano Modena taking full advantage of the superior Pirelli qualifying tyres to be second, followed by Patrese, Piquet, a disappointed Mansell, Berger, Prost, Moreno, Alesi, and de Cesaris. Alex Caffi had a huge accident in the swimming pool section on Saturday, after missing Thursday qualifying with a gearbox problem, and did not participate in the race. Elsewhere Martin Brundle was excluded for missing a weight check in Thursday practice.

Qualifying classification

Race

Race report
At the start, Senna got away well followed by Modena, Patrese, Mansell, and Prost. In the usual first corner mayhem Berger ran into the back of Piquet, dropping the Austrian to the back of the pack and breaking Piquet's suspension, Berger would later crash out. Senna quickly built up a huge lead over Modena and Patrese. Meanwhile, Andrea de Cesaris in the Jordan was eventually catching up to Jean Alesi and just outside the points in 7th place before retiring shortly after battling with the second Ferrari with a sticking throttle. Meanwhile, Aguri Suzuki in the Lola hit the wall at St. Devote on lap 25 with braking problems, as Modena's teammate Satoru Nakajima had spun and retired at the Nouvelle Chicane after making contact with Martini. Stefano Modena was blocked for a few laps by Emanuele Pirro in the Dallara who ignored blue flags, leading to BBC Commentator James Hunt saying "This is disgraceful driving by Emanuele Pirro". Most of Senna's chasers were eliminated on lap 42 when Modena's engine blew in the tunnel, spreading oil on the track which caused Patrese to crash. Alboreto also retired with engine failure at the same time. Just after taking 10th place from Eric Bernard, Blundell's Brabham lost control because of the oil from Modena's Tyrrell and crashed at the chicane. Senna now had a huge lead over Prost and Mansell, but the Englishman passed Prost with a daring move going into the chicane, and eventually started flying despite having problems earlier in the race. Prost would later pit to repair a damaged wheel causing a slow puncture, but the stop was very long and he dropped down to fifth.

Senna won his fourth Monaco Grand Prix in five years by 18 seconds over Mansell, Alesi, Moreno, Prost, and Pirro. The second-place finish was Nigel Mansell's first points of the season. Curiously, as Senna was slowing down after finishing the race, the pit crew mistakenly ordered him to take another lap, believing that he had crossed for the final lap.

Race classification

Championship standings after the race

Drivers' Championship standings

Constructors' Championship standings

 Note: Only the top five positions are included for both sets of standings.

References

Monaco Grand Prix
Monaco Grand Prix
Grand Prix